Fred Parkinson (born June 12, 1929), was an American politician who was a member of the Oregon House of Representatives.

Parkinson was born in Rexburg, Idaho in 1929. He attended Idaho State University where he earned a bachelor of science degree. He is the former owner of a drug store in Silverton, Oregon. He has also served as the mayor of Silverton.

References

1929 births
Living people
Republican Party members of the Oregon House of Representatives
People from Rexburg, Idaho
People from Silverton, Oregon
Idaho State University alumni
Mayors of places in Oregon